Brasserie Béierhaascht, is a Luxembourgish microbrewery/brewpub founded in Bascharage in 2002.

History

The microbrewery Beierhaascht was founded 2002. In 2002 it started brewing its own beers and opened the restaurant and brewpub.

Economy
As Brasserie Beierhaascht is only a microbrewery in Luxembourg, Beierhaascht beer does not make up much in Luxembourg's beer consumption. The large majority of the beer is sold in the brewpub itself, but the microbrewery is starting to expand on supermarkets and gas stations in southern Luxembourg as of 2016. At the moment, Brasserie Beierhaascht brew around 360 hectolitres all kind of beer merged.

Beers
The following beers are sold under the Béierhaascht name:

Lager beer Hell: a very soft and full lager (5.1 %)

Dark beer: with a special hop taste (6.3%)

Ambrée: made of the same quantity of malt and hop (5.2%)

Wheat beer: very light and refreshing in the summertime (5.3%)

Winter beer: very balanced and aromatic in the wintertime (5.0%)

See also
 Beer in Luxembourg

References

External links
 Official website

Breweries in Luxembourg
Food and drink companies established in 2000
Luxembourgian companies established in 2000